Boomer is a census-designated place (CDP) in Fayette County, West Virginia, United States. Boomer has a post office with ZIP code 25031. As of the 2010 census, its population was 615.

History
The community takes its name from nearby Boomer Branch Creek.  

The Boomer Coal and Coke Company operated four drift opening mines in Boomer Hollow during the early 1900s.  The mine employed a large number of locals, to include many Italian immigrants who settled in the small town.  On November 30, 1915, there was an explosion at the Number 2 Mine, which left 23 miners dead.  27 miners were rescued from the mine seven hours after the explosion, after they baracaded themselves into an area with fresh air. 

On February 16, 2015 the town, along with neighboring Adena Village, was evacuated following the derailment of a C&O train consisting of two locomotives and 109 rail cars. The train, carrying crude oil, quickly exploded into a fireball, destroying one residence and causing substantial damage to surrounding residences in both Adena Village and Boomer. Crude oil swiftly flowed into the Kanawha River and set the water ablaze for over a half mile.

References

Census-designated places in Fayette County, West Virginia
Census-designated places in West Virginia
Populated places on the Kanawha River